The Oi Rio Pro 2017 was an event of the Association of Surfing Professionals for 2017 World Surf League. This was held from 12 to 24 April at Rio de Janeiro, (Rio de Janeiro, Brazil) and contested by 36 surfers.

Round 1

Round 2

Round 3

Round 4

Round 5

Quarter finals

Semi finals

Final

References

2017 World Surf League
Rio Pro
Oi Rio Pro
Oi Rio Pro 2017
Oi Rio Pro 2017
Oi Rio Pro 2017